Yanqi Hui Autonomous County (Uyghur: Qarasheher, Karashahr) is an autonomous county in the Xinjiang Uyghur Autonomous Region and is under the administration of the Bayin'gholin Mongol Autonomous Prefecture. According to the 2002 census, it has a population of 120,000.

Administrative division
The autonomous county contains four towns and four townships:

Towns:
Yanqi Town ( / قاراشەھەر بازىرى), consisting of ten residential communities and one village, seat of the county government, 29.000 inhabitants (2000);
Qigxin ( / شىگشىن بازىرى), one residential community and nine villages, 12.629 inhabitants (2000);
Yongning ( / يۇڭنىڭ بازىرى), two residential communities and eight villages, 18.235 inhabitants (2000);
Sishilichengzi ( / دەنزىل بازىرى), one residential community and five villages, 8.722 inhabitants (2000);

Townships:
Beidaqu ( / بېيداچا يېزىسى), six villages, 9.026 inhabitants (2000);
Wuhaoqu ( / ئۇخاۋچا يېزىسى), one residential community and nine villages, 14.791 inhabitants (2000);
Qagan Qehe ( / چاغانچېكە يېزىسى), four villages, 5.841 inhabitants (2000);
Borhoi ( / بورقاي يېزىسى), five villages, 6.614 inhabitants (2000).

In addition, there three state owned operations in the county (2000):
State farm (for pasture farming) Wangjiazhuang ( / ۋاڭجياجۇاڭ چارۋىچىلىق فېرمىسى), 1.221 inhabitants,
Breeding farm for the Suhai breed, 1.555 inhabitants,
Production and Construction Corps Number 27 ( / 27-تۇەن مەيدانى), 9.895 inhabitants

Demographics

History
See Karasahr.

Climate

Economy
The county economy is predominantly agricultural with 13,000 hectares used to cultivate red pepper. The county is considered the most important area for red pepper production in China. During the red pepper harvest season beginning in September, the county is home to the remarkable sight of drying peppers sitting in the Gobi Desert "as far as the eye can see".

, there was about 25,300 acres (167,805 mu) of cultivated land in Kara Shahr.

References

 
County-level divisions of Xinjiang
Bayingolin Mongol Autonomous Prefecture
Hui autonomous counties